This is a list of television programs broadcast by Channel One in the United Kingdom and Ireland. The schedule for Channel One consisted of a mixture of American and British comedy, drama and factual programming, both acquired and commissioned. The channel was pitched between male-targeted channel Bravo and female-targeted channel Living. In addition to exclusive content, Channel One also showed some content from Living, Bravo and Challenge.

Former programming

References

Channel One programmes
Channel One
Channel One television programmes